Maurice Durand may refer to:
 Maurice Durand (architect)
 Maurice Durand (linguist)